Vernon Bigman is a Navajo artist known for his abstract painting. Bigman's work is housed in the permanent collections at the National Museum of the American Indian and San Francisco Art Institute. As in 2019, Bigman works in the library of the Pratt Institute.

Education 
Bigman has received a Bachelors in Fine Arts from the San Francisco Art Institute and a Masters in Fine Arts from the Pratt Institute in Brooklyn, New York. He also received schooling at the Institute of American Indian Arts.

Select artworks

Dreamsnake series 
The Dreamsnake series is a collection of five oil paintings on canvas:

Dream Snakes and Holy Mountain
Dream Snakes @ The Start of Ying and Yang
Dream Snakes and The Dreaming Grass
Dream Dance Kali
Black Dreams

Other artwork 

 Head of Wheel (Canvas, Oil Paint), made 1987, at National Museum of the American Indian

Select exhibitions 

 2009 Nathan Cumming Foundation New York, NY
 2008 New York Public Library, Tompkins Square Gallery, New York, NY
 2005 Graduate studios, San Francisco Art Institute, San Francisco, CA
 2005 New York Public Library Tompkins Square Gallery, New York, NY
1990 CommuniCations: Public Mirror: Artists Against Racial Prejudice, Museum of Modern Art, Manhattan, New york, NY

Awards 
Bigman has been awarded an honorable mention in the 2007 Sirsi-Dynix photography calendar competition.

References 

Year of birth missing (living people)
Living people
Navajo artists
21st-century Native Americans